Giuseppe Bonizzoni (22 April 1908 – 21 July 1976) was an Italian professional footballer who played as a defender.

He was the uncle of former footballer and manager Luigi Bonizzoni.

External links 
Profile at MagliaRossonera.it 

1908 births
1976 deaths
Italian footballers
Association football defenders
Serie A players
U.S. Cremonese players
A.C. Milan players
Calcio Padova players